Tigers FC is a Cayman Islander football club which currently plays in Cayman Islands' Premier League.

Current roster

See also
 Official Site
 caymanactive.com
 worldfootball.net

Football clubs in the Cayman Islands
Association football clubs established in 2003
2003 establishments in the Cayman Islands